Ostrinia putzufangensis is a moth in the family Crambidae. It was described by Akira Mutuura and Eugene G. Munroe in 1970. It is found in China.

References

Moths described in 1970
Pyraustinae